Events in the year 1987 in Turkey.

Parliament
17th Parliament of Turkey (up tp 29 November)
18th Parliament of Turkey

Incumbents
President – Kenan Evren 
Prime Minister – Turgut Özal 
Leader of the opposition – Erdal İnönü

Ruling party and the main opposition
 Ruling party – Motherland Party (ANAP) 
 Main opposition – Social Democratic Populist Party (SHP)

Cabinet
45th government of Turkey (up tp 21 December)
46th government of Turkey (from 21 December)

Events

January 
 10 January – Bülent Ecevit receives an 11-month prison sentence for political speeches.
 11 January – 2,500 bus passengers temporarily stranded in Kızıldağ Pass due to heavy snowfall.
 13 January – Avalanche in Tunceli Province results in 12 fatalities.
 14 January – Vehbi Koç named Businessman of the Year by the International Chamber of Commerce.
 25 January – Suleiman the Magnificent Exhibit in the United States
 25 January – Evren attends a two-day summit in Kuwait.

April 
 7 April – Alparslan Türkeş sentenced to 11 years in prison.
 14 April – Turkey applies for full membership in the European Community.

June 
 7 June – Galatasaray wins the championship
 29 June – General Necip Torumtay is named chief of general staff.

August 
 13 August – PKK militants kill 25 villagers in Siirt Province.

September 
 13 September – Bülent Ecevit named chairman of Democratic Left Party.
 24 September – Süleyman Demirel named chairman of True Path Party.

October 
 4 October – Alparslan Türkeş named chairman of Nationalist Work Party.
 11 October – Necmettin Erbakan named chairman of Welfare Party.

November 
 29 November – Motherland Party wins the majority of seats in Parliament in the general elections.

Births
1 January – Serdar Özkan, footballer
1 February – Barış Ataş, footballer
30 January – Arda Turan, footballer
15 February – Volkan Bekçi, footballer
3 May – Damla Sönmez,  actress
16 May – Can Bonomo, singer
14 August – Sinem Kobal, actress
14 September – Ceyda Ateş, actress
25 September – Mustafa Yumlu, footballer

Deaths
14 January – Turgut Demirağ (born in 1921), film producer
24 March – Ekrem Zeki Ün (born in 1910), musician
5 July – İdris Küçükömer (born in 1925), economist
22 July – Örsan Öymen (born in 1938), journalist
22 July – Fahrettin Kerim Gökay (born in 1900), civil servant, politician
8 October – İsmet Sıral (born in 1927) musician
10 October – Behice Boran (born in 1910), politician
12 October – Fahri Korutürk (born in 1903), former president (1973–1980)
11 December – Adile Naşit (born in 1930), actress

Gallery

See also
Turkey in the Eurovision Song Contest 1987
 1986–87 1.Lig

References

 
Years of the 20th century in Turkey
Turkey
Turkey
Turkey